Clinton Albert Pierce (June 15, 1894 – August 22, 1966) was an American brigadier general and commander of the 26th Cavalry Regiment (Philippine Scouts) during the Battle of Bataan.

Pierce served as a corporal in the Illinois National Guard field artillery from June to October 1916. He was commissioned as a U.S. Army second lieutenant of cavalry in March 1917. Pierce served as a temporary major during World War I.

Pierce graduated from the Cavalry School advanced course in 1932. He was promoted to major in March 1930 and lieutenant colonel in July 1939.

Sent to the Philippines in May 1940, Pierce received temporary promotions to colonel in October 1941 and brigadier general in January 1942. He then assumed command of the 71st Division. After surrendering to Japanese forces in April 1942, Pierce spent over three years as a prisoner of war.

In March 1947, his temporary promotion to brigadier general was renewed. In April 1947, his promotion to colonel was made permanent retroactive to December 1945. His postwar assignments were at Fort Riley, Kansas and Augsburg, West Germany. He retired from active duty as a brigadier general on February 28, 1951.

After his retirement, Pierce and his wife Margaret settled in Eureka Springs, Arkansas. He died at Eureka Springs City Hospital of lingering complications from an automobile accident and was interred at Arlington National Cemetery on August 25, 1966.

References

External links
Generals of World War II

1894 births
1966 deaths
Illinois National Guard personnel
Military personnel from New York City
United States Army personnel of World War I
United States Army generals of World War II
Recipients of the Silver Star
American prisoners of war in World War II
World War II prisoners of war held by Japan
Bataan Death March prisoners
Recipients of the Distinguished Service Medal (US Army)
United States Army generals
People from Eureka Springs, Arkansas
Burials at Arlington National Cemetery